Peggy Sonntag (born 13 January 1999) is a German Paralympic swimmer who competes in international level events. Her highest achievement is reaching two finals at the 2019 World Para Swimming Championships in London and reaching fourth place in the women's 50m freestyle S5 at the 2018 World Para Swimming European Championships in Dublin.

References

External links
 
 
 

1999 births
Living people
Paralympic swimmers of Germany
S5-classified Paralympic swimmers
People from Oschatz
Swimmers from Leipzig
Sportspeople from Potsdam